{{DISPLAYTITLE:C5H8N2O4}}
The molecular formula C5H8N2O4 (molar mass: 160.13 g/mol, exact mass: 160.0484 u) may refer to:

 Thymine glycol (5,6-dihydroxy-5,6-dihydrothymine)
 Tricholomic acid